The Atlanta Gladiators are a professional minor league ice hockey team based in Duluth, Georgia. The Gladiators play in the South Division of the ECHL's Eastern Conference.

The franchise originated as the Mobile Mysticks in 1995. They suspended operations in 2002 and moved to Duluth in 2003 where they were originally known as the Gwinnett Gladiators. In 2015, they changed their name to the Atlanta Gladiators. They were the South Division and American Conference champions in 2006, falling four-games-to-one to the Alaska Aces in the Kelly Cup finals.

History

Birth of the Gladiators
The franchise originated as the Mobile Mysticks who played in Mobile, Alabama, from 1995 to 2002. It suspended operations in 2002 due to declining attendance. After a year off, Toby Jeffreys, the owner of the Mysticks, relocated his franchise to Gwinnett County, Georgia, in 2003 and was rebranded the Gwinnett Gladiators. He then sold minority stakes of the franchise to local business owners to create Gwinnett County Hockey, LLC. Jeff Pyle—who served as the Mysticks' head coach starting in 1998—returned to the franchise for their first season.

The Gladiators made an appearance in the 2006 Kelly Cup Finals, losing to the Alaska Aces in five games.

On July 13, 2011, Pyle was named head coach of the American Hockey League's Texas Stars. The Gladiators announced on August 3, 2011, that John Wroblewski, former assistant coach for the Wheeling Nailers, had been selected to take Pyle's place as the team's head coach. The Gladiators won the ECHL South Division in the two years of Wrobelski's tenure.

On August 7, 2013, Wroblewski was hired by the AHL's Rochester Americans as an assistant coach. Rick Emmett, a former defenseman for the Gladiators, took over as head coach.

Emmett was relieved of his duties as head coach on December 2, 2014. At the time, assistant coach, and former Gladiator captain, Andy Brandt was named the interim head coach. Brandt would remain the interim head coach through the remainder of the 2014–15 season before being named to head coach on March 21, 2015. Former Valpellice Bulldogs head coach Mike Flanagan also joined the coaching staff in December 2014, serving as the team's assistant coach.

Rebranding as Atlanta Gladiators 
Following the 2014–15 season, the Gladiators became the affiliate of the Boston Bruins and their AHL affiliate, the Providence Bruins. On September 9, 2015, the Gladiators organization announced that they would be known as the Atlanta Gladiators to expand their brand to include the entire Atlanta metropolitan area. As part of the name change, the Gladiators updated their “primary” and “wordmark” logos to reflect the Atlanta designation. The rest of the Gladiators logos remained the same, as did the team colors.

After two seasons as head coach, Andy Brandt left to take the associate coaching position with St. Norbert College in 2017. The Gladiators would then hire two-time Kelly Cup winning coach Chuck Weber as his replacement.

During the 2017–18 season, the franchise was purchased by Virginia-based ownership group called Danor Vienna LLC, headed by real estate developer P. Daniel Orlich. Head coach Weber left after one season to take an assistant coaching position with Rensselaer Polytechnic Institute (RPI) NCAA Div. I men's team in order to be closer to home. Jeff Pyle was then brought back as head coach and general manager after leaving for the AHL in 2011.

In 2019, the Gladiators updated their primary colors from garnet and black to navy blue and gold.

On October 1, 2020, due to the COVID-19 pandemic the Gladiators enacted the ECHL's COVID-19 voluntary suspension policy and opted out of playing in the 2020–21 season. The team announced they would return to play in the 2021–22 season.

Prior to the start of the 2022–23 season on October 19, 2022, ownership of the team was transferred to ATL Hockey Group, LLC, led by businessman Alex Campbell with former NHL player and NHL on TNT commentator Anson Carter holding a minority stake. On November 7, 2022, the Gladiators unveiled plans to take on the identity of the former Atlanta Thrashers for a single game on December 16 against the Greenville Swamp Rabbits.

Affiliations
The Gladiators served as the ECHL affiliate of the NHL's Atlanta Thrashers and their AHL affiliate Chicago Wolves from their inception in 2003 until 2011, when the Thrashers franchise moved to Winnipeg and the Gladiators ended their affiliation with the franchise. The team also served as an affiliate for the Chicago Blackhawks during the 2008–09 season and for the Columbus Blue Jackets during the 2009–10 season.

On August 17, 2011, the Gladiators announced their affiliation with the Phoenix Coyotes and the Portland Pirates for the 2011–12 season. They later announced an affiliation agreement with the Buffalo Sabres, and their AHL affiliate, the Rochester Americans. That affiliation lapsed at the end of the 2011–12 season, leaving the Gladiators affiliated exclusively with Phoenix for the 2012–13 season. The Gladiators would carry that affiliation through the end of the 2014–15 season.

On August 6, 2015, the Gladiators announced a two-year affiliation deal with the Boston Bruins and their AHL affiliate, the Providence Bruins. In February 2017, the Gladiators and Bruins extended their affiliation for another two seasons and then added fifth season for 2019–20. In 2021, the Bruins switched their ECHL affiliation to the Maine Mariners and the Gladiators affiliated with the Ottawa Senators.

On August 25, 2022, the Gladiators became the ECHL affiliate for the Arizona Coyotes for the second time.

Season-by-season record

§The ECHL used an unbalanced playoff format from the 1998–99 season to the 2003–04 season and again from the 2005–06 season to the 2007–08 season which resulted in five rounds.

Players

Current roster
Updated November 21, 2022.

Notable players

Matt Anderson 
Adam Berkhoel
Cam Brown
Kevin Doell 
Louis Domingue 
Mike Dunham
Chris Durno

Patrick Dwyer 
Ryan Garbutt 
Michael Garnett
Simon Lajeunesse 
Mike Lee 
Adam Munro 
Derek Nesbitt
Pascal Pelletier 
Daniel Vladař

References

External links

Archive of ECHL standings and statistics

 
ECHL teams
Arizona Coyotes minor league affiliates
Atlanta Thrashers minor league affiliates
Boston Bruins minor league affiliates
Buffalo Sabres minor league affiliates
Columbus Blue Jackets minor league affiliates
Ice hockey teams in Georgia (U.S. state)
Ice hockey clubs established in 2003
Sports in Duluth, Georgia
2003 establishments in Georgia (U.S. state)